The Anguilla National Alliance was a centre-right political party in Anguilla. 
At the elections of 21 February 2005, the party first became part of the Anguilla United Front(AUF), that won 38.9% of popular votes and  4 out of 7 elected seats, and became a part of the AUF since then.

The party was a member of the Caribbean Democrat Union.

Electoral results

References

External links 

Political parties in Anguilla
Conservative parties in British Overseas Territories